Amador Valley Joint Union High School District v. State Board of Equalization (1978) 22 Cal.3d 208 was a California Supreme Court case, in which the Amador Valley Joint Union High School District challenged the constitutionality of California's Proposition 13, which placed a cap on property taxes.

Background
The proposition limited property tax assessments to the 1975 standard, eliminating $7 billion of the $11.4 billion in property tax revenue collected each year. According to The Washington Post'''', the "severe" limitations this imposed on state funding forced local governments and most school districts in California to make "drastic cutbacks." The district held that the measure was "so drastic and far-reaching that it was 'a revision' of the state Constitution and not a mere amendment."

Decision
Ultimately, the district was unsuccessful in its suit. In the ruling written by Justice Frank K. Richardson, the Supreme Court distinguished between "amendment" and "revision." The Court confirmed that an initiative cannot "revise" the constitution; Proposition 13, however, was an amendment to the California Constitution and not a "revision." In 2009, Amador Valley'' was cited by dissenting Justice Carlos R. Moreno in arguing the non-constitutionality of Proposition 8.

References

California state case law
Education in Alameda County, California
1978 in United States case law
United States education case law
United States taxation and revenue case law
Taxation in California
1978 California ballot propositions